Ernst Dieter Lueg (9 January 1930 in Essen – 22 May 2000 in Bonn) was a German author and television journalist.

Life 
Lueg worked as television journalist on German broadcaster Westdeutscher Rundfunk (WDR).

References

External links

RZ-Online: Ernst Dieter Lueg is dead

German broadcast news analysts
German television reporters and correspondents
20th-century German journalists
German male journalists
1930 births
2000 deaths
People from Essen
ARD (broadcaster) people
Westdeutscher Rundfunk people
Television people from North Rhine-Westphalia